Wu Shixian (Wu Shih-hsien, traditional: 吳石仙, simplified: 吴石仙, pinyin: Wú Shíxiān), also known as Wu Qingyun; ca. (unknown-1916) was a Chinese landscape painter during the Qing dynasty (1644–1912). His specific year of birth is unknown.

Wu was born in Nanjing in the Jiangsu province, and later lived in Shanghai and Japan. His style name was 'Shixian' and his sobriquet was 'splash-ink monk'. Wu specialized in painting foggy and rainy landscapes. The quality of his landscapes is sometimes attributed to his knowledge of Western Art, which at the time was already available in Shanghai.

References

1916 deaths
Painters from Nanjing
Qing dynasty landscape painters
Year of birth unknown